Vladivoj ( – January 1003) was Duke of Bohemia from 1002 until his death.

Life 
He was probably a member of the Piast dynasty, maybe the second son of Doubravka, daughter of Duke Boleslaus I of Bohemia, and her husband Duke Mieszko I of Poland, or a distant relative. When Duke Boleslaus III was dethroned during a revolt by the Czech Vršovci clan, the Bohemian nobles declared Vladivoj, who had earlier fled to Poland, duke in 1002. The Czech historian Dušan Třeštík writes that Vladivoj assumed the Bohemian throne with the support of the Polish duke Bolesław I the Brave. In November, he also obtained the support by the German king Henry II who enfeoffed him with the Bohemian duchy.

After Vladivoj died in 1003, Bolesław the Brave invaded Bohemia and restored Boleslaus III who had many Bohemian noblemen murdered. It is said that Vladivoj was an alcoholic, and drinking was a possible contributor to his death. A massacre of the Vršovci clan at Vyšehrad ordered by Boleslaus III led to his deposition and the succession of his younger brother Jaromír.

References

Bibliography
 
 
 

Dukes of Bohemia
980s births
1003 deaths
11th-century rulers in Europe
Christian monarchs